John W. Druce (born February 23, 1966) is a Canadian former professional ice hockey right winger who played in the National Hockey League (NHL) for the Washington Capitals, Winnipeg Jets, Los Angeles Kings and Philadelphia Flyers

Playing career
As a youth, he played in the 1979 Quebec International Pee-Wee Hockey Tournament with a minor ice hockey team from Peterborough.

In Druce's first year of Junior eligibility, he played for the Peterborough Petes B squad.  He made the Petes the next season and scored 12 goals in 54 games.  Druce was on a checking line with future Capital teammate Rob Murray.

Drafted in 1985 by the Washington Capitals in the second round (40th overall), Druce had a couple of modest seasons before scoring 32 goals for the Binghamton Whalers of the AHL in 1987-88 season.  He would not make the Capitals roster until the 1988–89 NHL season, where he was usually a fourth-line defensive specialist.

During the 1989–90 NHL season, his regular season statistics would continue to be unspectacular (8 goals in 45 games), but during the playoffs he exploded for 14 goals (a club record until 2018) and helped guide the Capitals to their first conference finals appearance.

In the division semifinals versus the New Jersey Devils, Druce scored three goals in the six game series won by Washington, including two game winners.  In the division finals versus the New York Rangers, Druce provided a shocking amount of offensive output.  In game two of the series, Druce scored a hat trick, his first since midget hockey.  Game three saw Druce tally two more goals and two assists. The Capitals needed this offensive production since their top scorer Dino Ciccarelli was injured.

Druce scored two goals in game four to lead the Capitals to a three games to one lead.  In overtime of game five, Druce fended off a check by Ron Greschner and deflected Geoff Courtnall's shot over goalie John Vanbiesbrouck for a 2-1 series winning victory.

Capitals general manager David Poile said, "John Druce was not on the top of my list—anybody's list—to come through the way he did. He came out of nowhere to be the hero."  Poile added, "He was not a top player in junior, not a top player in the minors. This is not only a good story today, but a good story for years to come."

At the time, Druce's total of nine goals in a playoff series put him in a five-way tie for third on the alltime list for goals scored in a playoff series, behind Jari Kurri (with 12, for the Edmonton Oilers in 1985) and Tim Kerr (with 10, for the Philadelphia Flyers in 1989).

Druce was unable to recapture that playoff magic by the time he was traded to the Winnipeg Jets in 1992. He would also play for the Los Angeles Kings and Philadelphia Flyers, and he would appear in the 1997 Stanley Cup finals with the Flyers team that took on the Detroit Red Wings.  He would play two seasons in the Deutsche Eishockey Liga before retiring from active play.

In 531 NHL games, Druce scored 113 goals and 126 assists.

Post-retirement
After playing, Druce became a junior hockey analyst on Rogers Sportsnet. In 2004, his daughter, Courtney, was diagnosed with leukemia. She relapsed with the disease twice but had been in remission since 2008.

In March 2016, his daughter Courtney lost her fifth fight with cancer which she battled for over 12 years, after beating leukemia three times and a rare form of cervical cancer once. She has inspired many with her bravery and her openness regarding all aspects of fighting this disease.

Druce was then inspired to join a cycling team to raise money for pediatric cancer research. In 2010, Druce was made an honorary constable of the Peterborough Lakefield Community Police Service, for his contributions to the Pedal For Hope in helping them surpass $1M. He currently works for Freedom 55 Financial in Peterborough.

Each year when the playoffs begin, Druce receives media inquiries due to his performance with the Capitals. He says:

Originally I was very proud of what happened there, but I played 14 years of professional hockey, so I thought, 'Jeez, I did more than that.' I've come to realize that's kind of my calling card. I'm very proud of it, and this time of year comes around and it's nice.

Career statistics

Notes and references

External links

 

1966 births
Living people
Augsburger Panther players
Baltimore Skipjacks players
Binghamton Whalers players
Canadian ice hockey right wingers
Hannover Scorpions players
Sportspeople from Peterborough, Ontario
Los Angeles Kings players
Peterborough Petes (ice hockey) players
Philadelphia Flyers players
Philadelphia Phantoms players
Phoenix Roadrunners (IHL) players
Washington Capitals draft picks
Washington Capitals players
Winnipeg Jets (1979–1996) players
Ice hockey people from Ontario
Canadian expatriate ice hockey players in Germany